Donald F. Featherstone (20 March 1918 – 3 September 2013) was a British author of more than forty books on wargaming and military history.

Life 

Donald Featherstone was born on 20 March 1918 in London. and during the Second World War, he joined the Royal Armoured Corps. An account of his war experiences can be found in his book Lost Tales. Professionally a physiotherapist living in Southampton, who worked for both Southampton Football Club and Hampshire County Cricket Club. Featherstone was first introduced to wargaming by reading H. G. Wells' Little Wars and his first opponent was his brother. His second opponent was Tony Bath many years later in 1955. His wife saw a description of a solo wargame being played in Southampton by Tony Bath and Featherstone then got in touch.

In 1960 the two of them began editing the UK version of the War Game Digest, a seminal wargaming newsletter started by Jack Scruby in the United States. Featherstone expressed disapproval of a trend towards articles  "attempting to spread an aura of pseudo-science over what is a pastime". In 1962, he started his own periodical, Wargamer's Newsletter. He produced this each month without a gap, with 214 editions until January 1980.

In 1961, he organised the first UK wargames convention at his home in Southampton. Two years later he organized the first National Wargames Championships Convention at a local hotel which was attended by about a hundred wargamers from all over the country.

In 1977 he was one of the founder members of the British Commission for Military History. In 1978, Featherstone appeared on the BBC to promote the hobby.

After a discussion with Paddy Griffith, Featherstone realised that wargaming as a hobby could aid considerably in understanding military history.

Death
Donald Featherstone died on 3 September 2013, aged 95, from complications following a fall at home.

Bibliography
War Games (1962), A revised edition has been printed as part of the History of Wargaming Project (see here), 
Tackle Model Soldiers This Way, Stanley Paul, London, (1963), 
Naval War Games, Stanley Paul, London, (1965), Updated edition 2009
Air War Games, (1966), 
Bowmen of England, (1967), 
At Them with the Bayonet! The First Sikh War New English Library, (1968), 
Advanced War Games, Stanley Paul, London, (1965), reprinted 2008
War Game Campaigns, Stanley Paul (1963), Sport Shelf reprinted (1970) 
War Game Campaigns, History of Wargaming Project , Sport Shelf; First Edition (1 Jan. 1970), 
Handbook For Model Soldier Collectors, (1969), 
Battles with Model Soldiers, (1970), 
Military Modelling, (1970), 
MacDonald of the 42nd, Seeley, (1971), 
Conflict In Hampshire, Publisher: HAMPSHIRE THE COUNTY MAGAZINE, (1 Jan. 1972)
Poitiers 1356: Knight's Battles for Wargamers, Hippocrene Books, (1 Jun. 1972), 
War Games through the Ages: Vol. 1 3000BC-1500AD, Stanley Paul, (1972), 
All for a Shilling a Day, New English Library, (1973), . Reprinted 2007
Solo Wargaming, Kaye & Ward, London, (1973), . Reprinted 2009 
Tank battles in miniature: A wargamers' guide to the Western Desert Campaign in 1940-1942, P. Stephens, (1973), 
Battle Notes for Wargamers, David & Charles, 1973;  Revised 2011
Captain Carey's Blunder (1973) 
War Games through the Ages: Vol. 2 1420-1783, Stanley Paul, 1974;  
War Games through the Ages: Vol. 3 1792-1879, Stanley Paul, 1975;  
Skirmish Wargaming, Patrick Stephens Limited, (1975), ; new edition 2009 
Wargaming: Ancient and Medieval Periods. David & Charles, UK, (1975), . Hippocrene Books, USA, (1975), .
War Games through the Ages: Vol. 4 1861-1945 Stanley Paul, (1976) 
Wargaming Airborne Operations, Kaye & Ward, (1975), reprinted 2009 
Wargaming Pike and Shot, (1977), Revised 2010
Better Military Modelling Kaye & Ward,(1977), 
Tank battles in miniature: A wargamers' guide to Mediterranean Campaigns 1943-1945, Patrick Stephens Limited, (1977), 
Weapons and Equipment of the Victorian Soldier Littlehampton Book Svs Ltd, (1978), 
Battles With Model Tanks TBS The Book Service Ltd, (19 April 1979), 
Featherstone's Complete Wargaming, David & Charles, (1989); 
Victoria's Enemies: An A-Z of British Colonial Warfare Blandford, (1989), 
The Peninsular War, Argus Books, (1991), 
Victorian Colonial Warfare: Africa, from the Campaigns Against the Kaffirs to the South African War, (1992), 
Victorian Colonial Warfare: India: From the Conquest of Sind to the Indian Mutiny, (1992), 
Khartoum 1885: General Gordon's last stand, Osprey, (1993), 
Tel El-Kebir 1882 : Wolseley's Conquest of Egypt Osprey, (1993), 
The History of the English Longbow, Dorset Press, (1995), 
Omdurman 1898 : Kitchener's victory in the Sudan, Osprey, (1994), 
Redcoats for the Raj, Valda Publishing, UK, (1996), 
Warriors and Warfare in Ancient and Medieval Times (1997), 
Khaki & Red: Soldiers of the Queen in India and Africa Arms & Armour Press, (1997), 
Bowmen of England Pen & Sword Books,(2003), 
The Battlefield Walker's Handbook Airlife Publishing Ltd, (2005), 
Donald Featherstone's Lost Tales, (2009), 
Donald Featherstone's The Badgered Men: A novel describing the life of the Victorian cavalry man at the time of the First Sikh War 1845-1846 (2011) 
Donald Featherstone's Wargaming Commando Operations: (2013)

References

External links 
 http://tankmuseum.org/museum-online/podcasts Donald Featherstone podcast at the Tank Museum, Bovington. Scroll down.

Board game designers
British writers
1918 births
2013 deaths
Miniature wargames
British Army personnel of World War II
Writers from London
Place of death missing
British physiotherapists
Accidental deaths from falls
Wargamers
Royal Armoured Corps soldiers